Luis Pérez Companc (born 2 January 1972 in Buenos Aires, Argentina) is a racecar driver.

He competed at the World Rally Championship from 2001 to 2008, claiming a fifth place at the 2007 Rally Japan, a sixth at the 2004 Rally Argentina, and seventh at the 2006 Rally New Zealand. In 2007 he founded the Munchi's Ford World Rally Team.

Companc has competed in sports car racing since 2008, with spells at the FIA GT Championship, FIA World Endurance Championship, European Le Mans Series and IMSA SportsCar Championship. He claimed class wins at the 2009 24 Hours of Spa, 2013 6 Hours of Spa-Francorchamps and 2014 6 Hours of Spa-Francorchamps, plus class podiums at the 24 Hours of Le Mans in 2012 and 2014.

He is a son of Gregorio Pérez Companc, and the older brother of Pablo Pérez Companc, also involved in motorsport as a one-time Indy Pro Series racer with the Chip Ganassi Racing team, but who suffered serious injuries in an on-track incident in 2007.

Rallying career

Companc competed initially in the Production World Rally Championship. He debuted on his home event in 2001. He then won the Argentina Rally Championship in 2005 with a Toyota Corolla WRC. His profile heightened for the 2006 season, when he assumed a place in the newly formed Stobart VK M-Sport Ford team alongside the teenager Matthew Wilson, son of Malcolm Wilson, the boss of both the Stobart VK squad and the Blue Oval marque's more senior manufacturer-backed works team, which would incidentally go on to win the world manufacturers' title that year.

Having initially fared on the early season rallies with older, 2004-specification Ford Focus RS WRCs, both Companc and Wilson would eventually be entrusted with examples of the 2006 championship-winning car, an arrangement which persisted into the 2007 season. Aboard the Focus, Companc competed on eight rallies in all in 2006, while planning ten rounds for the following year, and scored his first WRC points on the 2006 Rally New Zealand. Companc's team for 2007, Munchi's Ford World Rally Team chose to pair him with fellow native, Juan Pablo Raies, who was in turn co-driven by Pérez Companc's brother, Jorge. When Raies was replaced in the Munchi's team's post-Rally Argentina lineup by Federico Villagra, winner of that rally in Group N, Jorge Pérez Companc continued his co-driving duties in the second car, with the exception of Rally Japan when Villagra was co-driven by José Díaz, according to personal problems of Jorge.

His last WRC participation was at the 2008 Rally Finland.

Complete WRC results

24 Hours of Le Mans results

Complete FIA World Endurance Championship results
(key) (Races in bold indicate pole position; races in
italics indicate fastest lap)

Complete WeatherTech SportsCar Championship results
(key) (Races in bold indicate pole position; results in italics indicate fastest lap)

References

1972 births
Living people

FIA GT Championship drivers
American Le Mans Series drivers
European Le Mans Series drivers
24 Hours of Le Mans drivers
World Rally Championship drivers
Top Race V6 drivers
Argentine racing drivers
Argentine rally drivers
FIA World Endurance Championship drivers
24 Hours of Spa drivers
AF Corse drivers
M-Sport drivers
WeatherTech SportsCar Championship drivers